The Asian TV Cup is a Go competition.

Outline
The Asian TV Cup is the oldest continental tournament, dating back to 1989. The winners and runner ups of the biggest hayago competitions from Asia (Japan: NHK Cup, Korea: KBS Cup, China: CCTV Cup) battle in the biggest hayago tournament of all.

Past winners

See also
 Asian TV Cup at Go News
 Asian TV Cup at the Nihon Ki-in website (in Japanese)

Go competitions in Asia
China–Japan–South Korea relations